The 1995 Australian Drivers' Championship was open to drivers of racing cars complying with CAMS Formula Brabham regulations and was contested over a three-round series.
Round 1, Phillip Island Grand Prix Circuit, Victoria, 5 March
Round 2, Oran Park Raceway, New South Wales, 2 April
Round 3, Mallala Motor Sport Park, South Australia, 4 June
Each round consisted of two races, with points were awarded on a 20-16-14-12-10-8-6-4-2-1 basis to the top ten placegetters in each race.

The championship winner was awarded the 1995 CAMS Gold Star

Results

References

Australian Motor Racing Year, 1995
CAMS Manual of Motor Sport, 1995
Official Programme, Mallala, 4 June 1995
CAMS Manual On Line
www.formulaholden.com (retrieved 2001)

Australian Drivers' Championship
Drivers' Championship
Formula Holden